Tumor Circus was a collaboration between Jello Biafra and members of  Steel Pole Bath Tub and Grong Grong. They released one self-titled album in 1991.

Track listing
"Hazing for Success (Pork Grind Confidential)" – 9:03
"Human Cyst" - 3:26
"The Man with the Corkscrew Eyes" - 4:05
"Fireball" - 7:08
"Swine Flu" - 3:53
"Calcutta a-Go-Go" - 6:52
"Take Me Back or I'll Drown Our Dog (Headlines)" - 3:59
"Meathook Up My Rectum" - 4:56
"Turn Off the Respirator" - 15:38

Notes

The song "The Man with the Corkscrew Eyes" features a sound clip from The Fever (The Twilight Zone) at the beginning of the song: "This machine... It's inhuman, the way it lets you win a little then takes it all back.  It teases you.  It holds out promises and wields you.  It sucks you in and then..." The lyrics of the song "Headlines" reference the television programs Nightline, Twin Peaks, and The Simpsons, and the track features backing vocals from the late GWAR vocalist David Brockie.

1991 albums
Alternative Tentacles albums
Jello Biafra albums
Collaborative albums
Noise rock albums by American artists